Binyang railway station is a railway station in Binyang County, Nanning, Guangxi, China. It is an intermediate stop on the Nanning–Guangzhou high-speed railway and the Liuzhou–Nanning intercity railway. During construction, the name of the station was Litang West. Its name was changed to Binyang prior to opening. It opened on 6 March 2015. In April 2020, work began to increase the size of the station building. The new building was opened on 31 December 2020.

The station has two side platforms and an island platform, with a total of four platform faces.

References 

Railway stations in Guangxi
Railway stations in China opened in 2015